U.S. Citizenship and Immigration Services (USCIS) is an agency of the United States Department of Homeland Security (DHS) that administers the country's naturalization and immigration system. It is a successor to the Immigration and Naturalization Service (INS), which was dissolved by the Homeland Security Act of 2002 and replaced by three components within the DHS: USCIS, Immigration and Customs Enforcement (ICE), and Customs and Border Protection (CBP).

USCIS performs many of the duties of the former INS, namely processing and adjudicating various immigration matters, including applications for work visas, asylum, and citizenship. Additionally, the agency is officially tasked with safeguarding national security, maintaining immigration case backlogs, and improving efficiency. Ur Jaddou has been the director of USCIS since August 3, 2021.

Functions

USCIS processes immigrant visa petitions, naturalization applications, asylum applications, applications for adjustment of status (green cards), and refugee applications. It also makes adjudicative decisions performed at the service centers, and manages all other immigration benefits functions (i.e., not immigration enforcement) performed by the former INS. The USCIS's other responsibilities include:

 Administration of immigration services and benefits
 Issuing employment authorization documents (EAD)
 Adjudicating petitions for non-immigrant temporary workers (H-1B, O-1, etc.)

While core immigration benefits functions remain the same as under the INS, a new goal is to process immigrants' applications more efficiently. Improvement efforts have included attempts to reduce the applicant backlog and providing customer service through different channels, including the USCIS Contact Center with information in English and Spanish, Application Support Centers (ASCs), the Internet, and other channels. Enforcement of immigration laws remains under Customs and Border Protection (CBP) and Immigration and Customs Enforcement (ICE).

USCIS focuses on two key points on the immigrant's path to civic integration: when they first become permanent residents and when they are ready to begin the formal naturalization process. A lawful permanent resident is eligible to become a U.S. citizen after holding the Permanent Resident Card for at least five continuous years, with no trips out of the country of 180 days or more. If the lawful permanent resident marries a U.S. citizen, eligibility for U.S. citizenship is shortened to three years so long as the resident has been living with their spouse continuously for at least three years and the spouse has been a resident for at least three years.

Forms

USCIS handles all forms and processing materials related to immigration and naturalization. This is evident from USCIS' predecessor, the INS, (Immigration and Naturalization Service) which is defunct as of March 1, 2003.

USCIS currently handles two kinds of forms: those relating to immigration, and those related to naturalization. Forms are designated by a specific name, and an alphanumeric sequence consisting of one letter, followed by two or three digits. Forms related to immigration are designated with an I (for example, I-551, Permanent Resident Card) and forms related to naturalization are designated by an N (for example, N-400, Application for Naturalization).

List of directors of the U.S. Citizenship and Immigration Services

 Ken Cuccinelli served from July 8, 2019 to December 31, 2019 as de facto Acting Director. His tenure as Acting Director was ruled unlawful. He remained Principal Deputy Director at USCIS for the remainder of his tenure.

Immigration courts and judges
The United States immigration courts and immigration judges and the Board of Immigration Appeals which hears appeals from them, are part of the Executive Office for Immigration Review (EOIR) within the United States Department of Justice. (USCIS is part of the Department of Homeland Security.)

Operations

Internet presence
USCIS' official website was redesigned in 2009 and unveiled on September 22, 2009. The last major redesign before 2009 was in October 2006. The USCIS website now includes a virtual assistant, Emma, who answers questions in English and Spanish.

Inquiry and issue resolution
USCIS's website contains self-service tools, including a case status checker and address change request form. Applicants, petitioners, and their authorized representatives can also submit case inquiries and service requests on USCIS's website. The inquiries and requests are routed to the relevant USCIS center or office to process. Case inquiries may involve asking about a case that is outside of normal expected USCIS processing times for the form. Inquiries and service requests may also concern not receiving a notice, card, or document by mail, correcting typographical errors, and requesting disability accommodations.

If the self-service tools on USCIS's website cannot help resolve an issue, the applicant, petitioner, or authorized representative can contact the USCIS Contact Center. If the Contact Center cannot assist the inquirer directly, the issue will be forwarded to the relevant USCIS center or office for review. Some applicants and petitioners, primarily those who are currently outside of the United States, may also schedule appointments on USCIS's website

Funding
Unlike most other federal agencies, USCIS is funded almost entirely by user fees, most of it via the Immigration Examinations Fee Account (IEFA). USCIS is authorized to collect fees for its immigration case adjudication and naturalization services by the Immigration and Nationality Act.

Staffing
USCIS consists of approximately 19,000 federal employees and contractors working at 223 offices around the world.

Mission statement 
USCIS's mission statement was changed on February 9, 2022. USCIS Director Ur M. Jaddou announced the new mission statement. In 2021, USCIS leadership empowered employees to submit words that they felt best illustrated the agency's work. The new mission statement reflects this feedback from the workforce, the priorities of the Biden administration, and Jaddou's vision for an inclusive and accessible agency. 

The mission statement now reads:

See also

 Visa policy of the United States
 H-1B Visa
 Permanent residence (United States) ("Green card")
 Visa Waiver Program
 The other two major U.S. immigration-related agencies:
 U.S. Customs and Border Protection (CBP)
 U.S. Immigration and Customs Enforcement (ICE)

Comparable international agencies
 Immigration, Refugees and Citizenship Canada
 Irish Naturalisation and Immigration Service
 Directorate General of Immigration (Indonesia)
 UK Visas and Immigration

References

External links

 
 Homeland Security Act of 2002
USCIS in the Federal Register
what is USCIS by Cacfti
 site:www.uscis.gov/sites/default/files/document/foia/ — Freedom of Information Act documents - USCIS



 
United States Department of Homeland Security agencies
Immigration to the United States
Immigration services
History of immigration to the United States
Government agencies established in 2003
2003 establishments in Washington, D.C.
Organizations based in Washington, D.C.